Concepción Carmen Cascajosa Virino (born 1979) is a Spanish lecturer, working at the Charles III University of Madrid (UC3M). Her main research line is the history of audiovisual media. She has been noted as one of the foremost specialists on television series in Spain. Since 2021, she serves as member of the RTVE governing board.

Biography 
Born in 1979 in L'Hospitalet de Llobregat, Barcelona to Andalusian parents, she moved in 1984 together with her family to Casariche (province of Seville, Andalusia), where she was raised. Cascajosa earned a licentiate degree and later a PhD in Audiovisual Communication from the University of Seville. She entered the Charles III University of Madrid (UC3M) in 2006, working with Manuel Palacio. She became senior lecturer at the UC3M in 2012. In 2018, she was proposed as member of the RTVE governing board, endorsed by the PSOE. However, the parliamentary negotiations to renew the RTVE administration fell apart after she was voted by the Congress of Deputies.

Proposed again by the PSOE as candidate to the 10-member RTVE board in 2021, Cascajosa's appointment was passed by the Senate on 24 March 2021, together with the other 3 members of the shortlist to be voted by the Upper House. She assumed on 26 March 2021 together with the rest of the incoming board.

Works 

Author
 
 
 
 
Co-author
 
Editor

References 

Television studies
Academic staff of the Charles III University of Madrid
1979 births
RTVE Board members
University of Seville alumni
Mass media scholars
Living people